Götz Frömming (born 30 August 1968) is a German politician. Born in Eutin, Schleswig-Holstein, he represents Alternative for Germany (AfD). Götz Frömming has served as a member of the Bundestag from the state of Berlin since 2017.

Life 
He became member of the bundestag after the 2017 German federal election. He is a member of the Committee for Education, Research and Technology Assessment.

References

External links 

  
 Bundestag biography 

1968 births
Living people
Members of the Bundestag for Berlin
Members of the Bundestag 2017–2021
Members of the Bundestag 2021–2025
Members of the Bundestag for the Alternative for Germany